= Fast attack =

Fast attack may refer to:

- Attack submarine
- Fast attack craft
